The Make-Up Artists and Hair Stylists Guild Award for Best Special Make-Up Effects in a Motion Picture Made for Television or Special is one of the awards given annually to people working in the television industry by the Make-Up Artists and Hair Stylists Guild (MUAHS). It is presented to makeup artists who work in Special Effects makeup, or "Prosthetic makeup", whose work has been deemed "best" in a given year. In previous ceremonies, television films and specials were placed alongside miniseries, but this was changed in 2019, when miniseries nominees were placed alongside continuing series, while television films and specials were given this category.

Winners and nominees

2000s
Best Special Makeup Effects – Television (for a Mini-Series/Motion Picture Made for Television)

Best Special Makeup Effects in a Television Mini-Series or Motion Picture Made for Television

2010s
Best Special Make-Up Effects in a Motion Picture Made for Television or Special

2020s
Best Special Make-Up Effects in a Television Special, One Hour or More Program, or Movie for Television

References

Special Make-Up Effects in a Television Special, One Hour or More Program, or Movie for Television
Awards established in 2019